is a railway station in the city of Niimi, Okayama Prefecture, Japan.

Lines
 West Japan Railway Company
 Kishin Line

Adjacent stations

|-
!colspan=5|JR West

Railway stations in Okayama Prefecture